Ajay Bobby Chawla (born 2 December 1982) is a Danish cricketer. Chawla is a right-handed batsman who bowls leg break. He was born at Frederiksberg, Frederiksberg Municipality.

Having played cricket since he was nine and represented Denmark at Under-19 level, Chawla made his full debut for Denmark in a List A match against the Durham Cricket Board in the English domestic one-day tournament, the 2000 NatWest Trophy. In that same year he played in the European Championships in Scotland. The following year, he played for Denmark in the 2001 ICC Trophy in Canada, making six appearances. In August 2001, he played his second List A match, against Suffolk in the 1st round of the 2002 Cheltenham & Gloucester Trophy, which was played in 2001 to avoid fixture congestion. A further List A appearance came the following year in the 1st round of the 2003 Cheltenham & Gloucester Trophy against the Leicestershire Cricket Board, played to the same arrangement as the previous season's fixture. Two further appearances in that format followed, in the 2004 Cheltenham & Gloucester Trophy against Wales Minor Counties and in the 2005 Cheltenham & Gloucester Trophy against Northamptonshire at Svanholm Park, Brøndby. This was Denmark's last appearance in English domestic one-day cricket, with all their prior results having been mostly heavy defeats.

Also in 2005, Chawla appeared in his second and final ICC Trophy, which was held in Ireland. The International Cricket Council afforded List A status to these matches, with Chawla making seven appearances during the tournament, taking 9 wickets at an average of 23.22, with best figures of 3/42. Later in 2007, Chawla was selected as part of Denmark's squad for the World Cricket League Division Two in Namibia. Chawla made a further four List A appearances during the tournament, taking 10 wickets at an average of 15.20, with best figures of 4/38. Two years later, he was selected as part of the Denmark squad for the World Cup Qualifier in South Africa, where he made seven List A appearances, including his final appearance to date in that format, against Oman. He struggled with the ball during the tournament, taking just 2 wickets at an expensive average of 115.00.

In 2011, Chawla was selected as part of Denmark's squad for the 2011 ICC World Cricket League Division Three tournament in Hong Kong, making four appearances. In March 2012, Denmark took part in the World Twenty20 Qualifier in the United Arab Emirates, with Chawla selected in their fourteen-man squad. Chawla made his Twenty20 debut during the tournament against Bermuda at the Sharjah Cricket Association Stadium. He made six further appearances during the competition, the last of which came against Oman, taking 6 wickets during the tournament, at an average of 20.33 and with best figures of 3/19. In August 2012, he was selected in Denmark's fourteen man squad for the World Cricket League Division Four in Malaysia.

Outside of cricket he works as a banker.

References

External links
Bobby Chawla at ESPNcricinfo
Bobby Chawla at CricketArchive

1982 births
Living people
Sportspeople from Frederiksberg
Danish cricketers
Danish bankers
Danish people of Indian descent